Shining for One Thing, is a 2022 Chinese romance fantasy mystery coming-of-age streaming television series, starring Qu Chuxiao and Zhang Jianing.

The series was released on January 26, 2022 on IQIYI.

Synopsis 
Lin Beixing, an "experienced girl" who is about to enter her 30s, missed out on achieving her dream of love as her boyfriend, Zhan Yu, breaks the contract, and her life and work have become a mess. However, not sure if this is the God playing tricks on her, Lin Beixing returned to the age of eighteen. The third year of high school is a nightmare, but Lin Beixing decided to retake the college entrance examination and get rid of Zhan Yu, to live anew for herself. However, Lin Beixing's sweet dream was dashed by a boy called Zhang Wansen. The accidental encounter of Zhang Wansen after the college entrance examination became the switch to end Lin Beixing's time and space journey. Lin Beixing began to investigate the cause of Zhang Wansen's death and embarked on a difficult journey to save Zhang Wansen. The days in high school were romantic and short, and Lin Beixing's changes allowed her to reap the beautiful moments that she had neglected. With the arrival of summer, Lin Beixing also found that she not only saved Zhang Wansen, but also saved the boy's love for her since she was young that is deeper than the sea.

Cast and characters
Main cast
 Qu Chuxiao as Zhang Wansen
 Zhang Jianing as Lin Beixing

Supporting cast
 Caesar Wu as Zhan Yu
 Fu Jing as Gao Ge
 Luo Mingjie as Yang Chao Yang
 Jiang Yun Lin as Mai Zi
 Xu Ziyin as Han Teng Teng
 Cui Yi as Lin Beixing's mom
 Yan Chang as Lei Ge
 Sun Tian Yu as Liu Ga
 Hou Wei Tao as Lin Dahai

Production
The series began filming in December 2020 in Xiamen, China, and wrapped up in February 2021.

External links

References

2022 Chinese television series debuts
Chinese romantic fantasy television series
Chinese mystery television series